Chak Budho is a village with approximately 3,000 inhabitants in Malka Union Council, Kharian Tehsil, Gujrat District, Punjab, Pakistan.  The main and only cast of village is Chib Rajput.

Populated places in Gujrat District +923414753355